Kundal Dam is located in District Swabi, Khyber Pakhtunkhwa. The kundal dam will supply water for irrigation to fertile the barren land and control the floods as well as to fulfill water scarcity in the area. It will irrigate about 13340 acres of land. The Dam is sponsored by the Ministry of Water and Power and Directorate General Small Dams, Irrigation Department, Government of Khyber Pakhtunkhwa are executing agencies of the kundal project.

Kundal dam is 48m high dam, having length 320m.Normal conservation level of the dam is 487.5a amsl. while dead level is 467m. it was designed by M/s consulting associates peshawar and Construction supervision was also made by them. Contractor was Sarwar and co. pvt. Irrigation system was designed by Engr Salah Ud Din. Irrigation system consist of three inverted syphon and many aqueduct and fall structures. Design capacity of main canal is 54 cusecs.

See also 

 List of dams and reservoirs in Pakistan
 List of power stations in Pakistan
 Tarbela Dam

References

External links
 Kundal Dam Facebook Page

Dams in Pakistan
Hydroelectric power stations in Pakistan
Swabi District
Dams in Khyber Pakhtunkhwa